Angel Rusev (born 6 January 1981) is a Bulgarian footballer who currently plays as a midfielder for Kariana Erden.

References

Living people
1981 births
People from Teteven
Bulgarian footballers
Association football midfielders
PFC Litex Lovech players
PFC Spartak Pleven players
PFC Chernomorets Burgas players
PFC Vidima-Rakovski Sevlievo players
PFC Marek Dupnitsa players
FC Botev Vratsa players
FC Kariana Erden players
First Professional Football League (Bulgaria) players